Caviar spoons are traditionally made of inert materials, such as animal horn, gold, mother of pearl, and wood.

There is a custom that caviar should not be served with a metal spoon, because metal may impart an undesirable flavour. Though caviar is stored and sold in metal tins, non-reactive interior linings are put in place to prevent any adverse effects. Silver spoons are reactive, however, and thus may affect the flavor.

A caviar knife is frequently sold together with the spoon. It is a 5 inches long flat knife with a bulbous tip, typically also made of a fancy material like mother-of-pearl.

See also 
 Caviar bowl

References

Sources
 
 

Spoons
Eating utensils
Serving utensils
Roe